Hedda (minor planet designation: 207 Hedda) is a sizeable Main belt asteroid. It is a C-type asteroid, meaning it is primitive in composition and dark in colour. This asteroid was discovered by Johann Palisa on October 17, 1879, in Pola and was named after Hedwig, wife of astronomer Friedrich A. T. Winnecke.

Attempts to determine the rotation period for this asteroid have led to conflicting results. A study published in 2010 using photometric observations from Organ Mesa Observatory showed a rotation period of 19.489 ± 0.002 hours and a brightness variation of 0.18 ± 0.02 in magnitude.

References

External links
 The Asteroid Orbital Elements Database
 Asteroid Albedo Compilation
 
 

Background asteroids
Hedda
Hedda
C-type asteroids (Tholen)
Ch-type asteroids (SMASS)
18791017